The 1971 Kansas Jayhawks football team represented the University of Kansas in the Big Eight Conference during the 1971 NCAA University Division football season. In their first season under head coach Don Fambrough, the Jayhawks compiled a 4–7 record (2–5 against conference opponents), tied for fifth place in the conference, and were outscored by opponents by a combined total of 286 to 187. They played their home games at Memorial Stadium in Lawrence, Kansas.

The team's statistical leaders included Dave Jaynes with 748 passing yards, Delvin Williams with 509 rushing yards and John Schroll with 491 receiving yards. Kenny Page and Bob Childs were the team captains.

Schedule

References

Kansas
Kansas Jayhawks football seasons
Kansas Jayhawks football